Fernando Silva (born 17 December 1972) is a Portuguese badminton player. He competed in two events at the 1992 Summer Olympics. He won 4 bronze medals at the BWF World Senior Championships.

Career 
After his participation in the 1992 Olympic Games, Silva partnered with Ricardo Fernandes and won the Slovenian International title in 1994. He later swapped partners with Marco Vasconcelos and won the Portugal International two consecutive times in 1997 and 1998 with Hugo Rodrigues.

Achievements

World Senior Championships 
Men's singles

Mixed doubles

Achievements

BWF/IBF International Challenge/Series (2 titleS, 3 runners-up) 
Men's singles

Men's doubles

  BWF International Challenge tournament
  BWF International Series tournament
  BWF Future Series tournament

References

External links
 

1972 births
Living people
Portuguese male badminton players
Olympic badminton players of Portugal
Badminton players at the 1992 Summer Olympics
People from Peniche, Portugal
Sportspeople from Leiria District